By 2020, the Manhattan district attorney (DA) had opened a criminal case to determine whether the Trump Organization has committed financial fraud. The case has led to two of the organization's subsidiary companies being found guilty of 17 charges including tax fraud.

The organization ceased a number of illegal practices, some of which had reputedly been executed since the 1980s, around the time of Donald Trump's election as U.S. president. Manhattan DA Cyrus Vance Jr. reportedly began scrutinizing the company in 2018 related to Trump personal attorney Michael Cohen's hush-money payment to Stormy Daniels. After the organization's conviction under Manhattan DA Alvin Bragg, it was reported that the DA may return to the hush-money scandal as part of its larger criminal probe.

By mid-2021, New York State Attorney General Letitia James had joined the DA's criminal inquiry, with the latter convening a grand jury. Prosecutors filed 10 charges against the organization, alleging that it had conducted a  "scheme to defraud" the government, and 15 felony counts against longtime chief financial officer Allen Weisselberg—who invoked his Fifth Amendment right against self-incrimination more than 500 times in his testimony.

In August 2022, Weisselberg pleaded guilty and agreed to testify against the organization in exchange for a reduced sentence. A trial was held from October to December. Evidence including the testimonies of Weisselberg and others indicate that he and other executives—as well as the two subsidiaries—participated in fraudulent schemes, including recording some employee bonuses as pay for contract work, with the defense asserting that the organization was unaware of impropriety and that Trump family members did not intend to participate in wrongdoing despite signing relevant checks.

Overview

In January 2017, ahead of Trump's inauguration as U.S. president, his attorney Sheri Dillon announced that the Trump Organization's businesses would be transferred to a trust controlled by Trump's sons Donald Jr. and Eric Trump, as well as longtime chief financial officer (CFO) Allen Weisselberg.

In August 2018, Manhattan District Attorney (DA) Cyrus Vance Jr. was reported to be considering a criminal investigation of the organization and two of its senior executives for their reimbursement of then-Trump personal attorney Michael Cohen for his hush-money payment to Stormy Daniels; the organization recorded the reimbursement as a legal expense although Cohen did no legal work in the matter. In August 2019, Vance subpoenaed the organization's accountants, Mazars, for Trump's tax returns. In July 2020, the U.S. Supreme Court ruled that Trump's tax records could be released to prosecutors, producing millions of pages of documents, reportedly including Trump's returns from January 2011 to August 2019. In November 2022, the DA's office (then under Alvin Bragg) was reportedly again scrutinizing the hush-money affair in a possible move towards mounting a criminal case against Trump. At the end of the month, following a Supreme Court ruling, the U.S. Treasury Department released Trump's returns from 2015 to 2020 to the House Ways and Means Committee. The committee subsequently voted to make these public.

The Manhattan DA suggested in an August 2020 federal court filing that the organization was under investigation for bank and insurance fraud. That November, The New York Times reported that both investigators had recently issued subpoenas to the organization regarding tax deductions on millions of dollars in consulting fees, some of which were apparently paid to Ivanka Trump. By December 2020, the Manhattan DA had interviewed employees of Aon and Deutsche Bank, and hired FTI Consulting to provide forensic analysis to determine whether the organization had altered asset values for financial gain.

The first grand jury resulted in charges against Weisselberg, who subsequently provided testimony against the organization, which was in turn used to convict two subsidiary companies. After the sentencing of the companies on January 13, 2023, Bragg stated that the broader investigation of the organization would continue.

First grand jury 
On May 18, 2021, the office of the New York State Attorney General (OAG) announced that it was joining the Manhattan DA's office in probing the organization "in a criminal capacity." The Manhattan DA convened a special grand jury to consider indicting Trump, his company and/or executives. Jeffrey McConney, a senior vice president and controller who had worked for almost 35 years at the company, testified before the grand jury after being subpoenaed. The Daily Beast later reported that McConney claimed not to have known that fringe benefits should be reported as income. 

By June 2021, Allen Weisselberg and chief operating officer Matthew Calamari Sr. were under scrutiny of the Manhattan DA investigation. Trump allegedly indicated that he would provide tuition for Barry and Jennifer's children at a top-rated private school (ultimately costing over $50,000 a year per child) instead of giving the two employees a raise, and directly told Jennifer that he would cover this cost. On June 28, she stated that she was planning to provide testimony in the case.

On July 1, New York prosecutors charged the organization with a "15 year 'scheme to defraud' the government", conspiracy, and falsifying business records. Prosecutors filed 10 charges against the organization and its Trump Payroll Corporation entity, and 15 felony counts against Weisselberg, including grand larceny and offering a false instrument for filing. Prosecutors allege that Weisselberg received about $1.76 million in undeclared indirect compensation in the form of free rent and utilities, car leases for himself and his wife, and school tuition for his grandchildren (the checks for which Trump allegedly signed). They further allege that the organization kept track of the fringe benefits on internal spreadsheets and did not report them as taxable income. Both the organization and Weisselberg pleaded not guilty. On July 8, the organization removed Weisselberg as director of the company running Trump International Golf Links, Scotland, and on July 9, it removed him as director of 40 subsidiaries registered in Florida.
The organization and Weisselberg next appeared in court on September 20. Weisselberg's lawyer revealed that over 3 million documents had been discovered in the basement of an unidentified , including tax documents related to the organization, and announced that "We have strong reason to believe there could be other indictments coming." Weisselberg's defense team asked for more time to review the documents. The judge agreed to this request and tentatively set a trial date for about a year in the future. Prosecutors reportedly hoped that Weisselberg would provide testimony against Donald Trump in exchange for a reduced or rescinded sentence. This refusal reportedly led to the indictment of Weisselberg, the Trump Corporation and Trump Payroll Corporation. New York AG Letitia James later reported that, like Eric Trump in his testimony for her investigation, Weisselberg had invoked his Fifth Amendment right against self-incrimination over 500 times.

As of mid-August, prosecutors were reportedly negotiating with a lawyer for Calamari Sr. to discuss his cooperation. Matthew Calamari Jr., who heads security for the organization, was subpoenaed on August 31 to testify before the grand jury; both he and Jeffrey McConney were expected to testify on September 2. In October, Manhattan judge Juan Merchan held a trial regarding the organization's failure to comply with four grand jury subpoenas and three court orders; on this basis, in December, Merchan held the company in contempt of court and ordered the Trump Corporation and Trump Payroll Corporation to pay $4,000 in fines. The ruling remained sealed until December 2022 to avoid influencing the trial.

Later in October 2021, Trump testified in Galicia v. Trump that he personally oversaw Calamari Sr.'s compensation. As of November 2021, the lawyer for the Calamaris expected no charges to be brought against Calamari Sr. The original grand jury was expected to remain convened until that month.

Second grand jury 
The Manhattan DA convened a second grand jury the last week of October 2021; it began to hear evidence on November 4, reportedly to consider charges related to the company's valuation of assets.
By November 22, prosecutors were scrutinizing several of the organization's properties for which, between 2011 and 2015, far higher values were presented to potential lenders than were reported to tax officials. In the most extreme case, in 2012, the 40 Wall Street building was cited as being worth $527 million to the former, but only $16.7 million to the latter. Michael Cohen subsequently stated that prosecutors could "indict Donald Trump tomorrow if they really wanted, and be successful".
By mid-December, an accountant for Trump had testified before the grand jury. Prosecutors were reportedly examining whether the organization provided its outside accountants, Mazars USA, with cherry-picked information with which to prepare favorable financial statements to present to prospective lenders. Mazars provided disclaimers with its financial statements for the organization, indicating that the firm had not audited, reviewed, or given any assurances about them, and noting that "Donald J. Trump is responsible for the preparation and fair presentation of the financial statement in accordance with accounting principles generally accepted in the United States of America."
On February 9, 2022, Mazars informed the organization that it would no longer support the financial statements it had prepared for the organization from mid-2010 to mid-2020.

On February 22, 2022, lawyers for the organization and Weisselberg filed motions requesting that the Manhattan DA's criminal investigation be dismissed, alleging "political animus". Weisselberg's lawyers argued that the charges against him were related to federal taxes and that he had been granted federal immunity due to his cooperation in the case against Cohen (who allegedly recommended prosecutors try to flip Weisselberg against Trump); his lawyers further claimed that prosecutors had threatened to charge Weisselberg's son Barry (a former Trump Organization employee who was allegedly provided unreported fringe benefits) and requested that evidence from two prosecutors be suppressed because it was improperly divulged while Weisselberg was in custody. The same day, Bragg told two of his lead prosecutors, Mark F. Pomerantz and Carey R. Dunne, that he was not ready to indict Trump based on the difficulty of proving that he had criminal intent. The two prosecutors resigned the following day, with Pomerantz writing in his resignation letter that there is "evidence sufficient to establish Mr. Trump's guilt beyond a reasonable doubt" regarding "numerous felony violations" and that Vance had directed his deputies to seek indictments "as soon as reasonably possible". In a court filing made public on May 23, prosecutors for the DA asked a judge to uphold the criminal charges against the organization and Weisselberg, except for the charge of criminal tax evasion against the latter due to a missed deadline. The filing clarified that the investigation preceded Cohen's cooperation in the case, the defendants having argued that it was spurred by a "vendetta" of his. According to prosecutors for the DA, Cohen overstated his role in the proceedings against Trump.

The New York Times reported that the resignations followed a monthlong pause of evidence being presented to the jury, which was expected to remain seated until the end of April, as well as discussions about charging Trump with conspiracy and falsifying financial records (instead of a fraud charge). The most recent evidence heard was reportedly from Trump's Mazars accountant and an expert in real-estate property valuation from FTI Consulting. On February 24, Bragg recruited his investigations chief to the lead prosecutor role. The DA's office was expected to continue debating the strength of the case. On April 7, Bragg issued a statement insisting that the investigation was still ongoing, with new evidence being reviewed, and pledged to make the findings public whether or not indictments were made. On April 26, a court filing related to Galicia v. Trump revealed that Trump had admitted to overseeing Calamari Sr.'s compensation and The Daily Beast reported that prosecutors had spent months probing Calamari Sr.'s fringe benefits, even offering immunity to Calamari Jr. in exchange for testimony. Witnesses were still being interviewed as of late April, shortly before the jury expired.

According to Pomerantz's 2023 book on the investigation, racketeering charges were considered for Trump, with Pomerantz comparing the real-estate mogul to mob boss John Gotti. Trump's lawyer Joe Tacopina rejected the comparison. Pomerantz also stated that "To rebut the claim that Trump believed his own ‘hype'... we would have to show, and stress, that Donald Trump was not legally insane." According to Pomerantz, prosecutors were weeks away from charging Trump in late 2020 for the discrepancy in 40 Wall Street's valuation (with the "absurd" value reported to tax officials under penalty of perjury being less than the building's total annual rent), but the New York City Law Department downplayed this as a standard negotiating tactic. Pomerantz compared Bragg's decision not to follow his predecessor's lead in prosecuting Trump to a plane crash. Bragg defended himself by stating that "Mr. Pomerantz's plane wasn't ready for takeoff." Pomerantz further argued that if anyone else besides Trump or another former president had carried out the same conduct, charges would have immediately been brought against them.

Trial 
On August 12, 2022, lawyers for the organization and Weisselberg appeared before Judge Merchan to discuss pretrial matters and set a date for trial. Merchan agreed to dismiss one charge against the company as the statute of limitations had lapsed. He set jury selection for October 24. (The hearing had originally been scheduled for July 12, with trial expected to begin about two months later.)

On August 18, Weisselberg pleaded guilty to 15 felonies and agreed to testify against the organization in a plea deal in which he is set to serve five months in prison followed by five years of probation and must pay nearly $2 million in back taxes, interest, and penalties. Had he not taken the plea agreement, he faced 5 to 15 years in prison. Bragg argued that the plea "directly implicates the Trump Organization in a wide range of criminal activity", while the organization refused a plea deal, reportedly because the DA wanted it to plead guilty to felonies while Trump lawyers suggested a plea to a misdemeanor, and Trump himself reputedly rejected taking any plea because of the negative political impact implied and/or it requiring the two corporate entities under indictment, the Trump Corporation and Trump Payroll Corporation, to say their employees knowingly engaged in tax fraud. The organization asserted that the corporate entities would plead not guilty as they had "done nothing wrong". On September 12, Merchan set a week for either side to file additional motions and stated that he would not allow the organization or Weisselberg "in any way to bring up a selective prosecution claim, or claim this is some sort of novel prosecution".

Jury selection began on October 24, when of 132 candidates, about half were dismissed (some due to potential bias regarding the defense or prosecution) and seven jurors were chosen. Trump lawyers used two of their peremptory challenges. Jury selection concluded on October 28, and opening statements began October 31. On that day, prosecutors stated that Weisselberg would provide the "inside story" of the company's use of fringe benefits, asserting that he had ordered payments to be deleted from ledgers following Trump's election as U.S. president. Lawyers for the organization accused Weisselberg of lying and claimed that he profited from the company without its or Trump's knowledge. Jeffrey McConney testified that he deducted the cost of items such as apartments, car leases and cash from gross salaries, resulting in lower tax payments. He stated that he was afraid he would be fired if he told Trump about schemes benefiting Weisselberg and Calamari Sr. Additionally, McConney said that after Trump's election, attorney Sheri Dillon oversaw an overhaul of the organization's tax practices. McConney testified that a page of Trump's personal ledger from 2012 (provided by Mazars) had been altered to remove Weisselberg's name from a payment of over $30,000 to a private school (on a copy provided by the organization to a Manhattan jury in 2021). McConney later testified that he "knew it wasn't correct [but] wasn't sure it was illegal" to pay Weisselberg's wife $6,000 for a job she did not perform so she could gain Social Security benefits and that he was afraid he would lose his job if he told others about his work for Weisselberg related to fringe benefits. Both McConney and Weisselberg said they relied on Mazars accountant Donald Bender, who served the organization for a number of years, to assure the legality of their actions. McConney was declared a hostile witness, and subsequently, evidence was presented that the company provided a number of people (including Allen and Barry Weisselberg) benefits logged as payments for independent contract work. According to Weisselberg, these bonuses were drawn from subsidiary entities such as Mar-a-Lago and Trump Productions, which deducted them as expenses. Weisselberg testified that this scheme was amongst a number of illegal tax practices the organization ceased around the time of Trump's election. Weisselberg said he and McConney altered the former's payroll record to deduct the cost of bonuses and that they falsified W-2 forms. Weisselberg stated that some fringe payments to employees were as high as $100,000 and that this practice had been performed via Form 1099 since the 1980s. He testified that he received $1.76 million in untaxed benefits and that Trump authorized the compensation for him and other senior executives. Weisselberg testified that the Trumps did not know about his scheme to dodge taxes by using his paychecks to reimburse the organization for tuition checks for his grandchildren, which were signed by Donald Trump and (in 2017) Donald Jr. When asked, Weisselberg stated that "I committed [the tax-fraud] crimes with Jeffrey McConney [whom] I dealt with directly [as well as the] Trump Corporation and Trump Payroll Corporation." Weisselberg went on to testify that in 2017, after Eric and Donald Trump Jr. learned of his scheme, he used its cessation to negotiate a raise from them—procuring an additional $200,000 starting in 2019.

On November 21, the prosecution rested its case, opting not to call as a witness Donald Bender, who had been granted immunity for previously providing testimony. The defense began the same day, calling Bender to the stand and presenting documents potentially suggesting his partial awareness of company executives receiving fringe benefits reported as independent contract work. On November 28, Merchan denied the defense's request to introduce filings made the preceding night. Bender testified that Weisselberg claimed to meet the requirements to be paid as an independent contractor. He further testified that the two corporate entities and some employees had lowered their taxes via the payment of bonuses as if it was for consulting work. After being shown the company's general ledger, on which perks provided to Weisselberg and other executives were apparently obvious, Bender stated that it was not his responsibility to review. When asked, Bender said he did "an amazing job" for the company. The defense attempted to discredit him as a witness and the same day, rested its case. Merchan declined to rule on a motion to dismiss the charges against the defense.

Two days of closing arguments began on December 1. Early in the defense's presentation, prosectors objected to the inclusion of excerpts of witness testimony that had been stricken from the record, which the judge ordered to be removed. The defense argued that Weisselberg acted "solely to benefit himself", with only McConney and Bender sharing his fault. Contrarily, the prosecution asserted that ample evidence has shown that Weisselberg intended to benefit the company (to a lesser extent than himself), with McConney helping him and another executive lower their salaries and use the  savings to pay for perks on the company's behalf—as well as lower its payroll costs and payroll taxes related to Medicare. The prosecution highlighted a secret log McConney used to track reduced salaries and corresponding perks requested by Weisselberg and others, leading to separate books being provided to the Internal Revenue Service (IRS). According to the prosecution, the organization saved $3.5 million from Weisselberg's scheme and at a certain point benefited more from it than him. The prosecution implied that Weisselberg may be protecting the organization to ensure a future bonus payment from his employer. The prosecution further alleged that Donald Trump was aware of the fraudulent schemes and that he "explicitly [sanctioned] tax fraud", citing a 2012 document with his signature authorizing a reduction of Calamari Sr.'s salary by $72,000 (the same amount as his Park Avenue apartment rent), but said proving Trump's knowledge was unnecessary to implicate the company. The defense both made an objection to the accusation, which Merchan sustained (although he ruled that the accusation was fair for the prosecution to have mentioned), and used it to call for a mistrial, which the judge denied.

After denying requests by the defense to treat Trump's tuition payments for Weisselberg's grandchildren as gifts and to have a corporate liability law declared "constitutionally vague", Merchan instructed jurors regarding the application of New York's corporate liability law to their verdict. The jury began deliberations on December 5. Per New York law, the jury had to find that Weisselberg (and/or McConney) acted "in behalf of" the organization in order to declare it guilty of Weisselberg's crimes; according to Merchan, this required it to be shown that "there was some intent to benefit the corporation" but this need not have been Weisselberg's main goal. About 400 exhibits were presented as evidence, some thousands of pages long. According to one juror, the jury referred to Trump as "Smith" to reduce bias and suspected that he and his family likely knew about the fraud scheme. The jury reputedly found defense lawyer Michael van der Veen's argument that "Weisselberg did it for Weisselberg" demeaning, comparing the statement negatively to the defense's argument in the O. J. Simpson murder case that "If it doesn't fit, you must acquit". The jury further reportedly found van der Veen's mockery of Bender's voice and speech impediment "small-minded and unnecessary" and thought McConney's verbosity during his testimony for the defense (as compared to his quietude for the prosecution) likely constituted "incompetent lying" meant to stonewall the prosecution. The jury unanimously found the organization guilty of fraud and carefully considered each charge.

On December 6, the organization was convicted of all 17 criminal charges it faced, nine for the Trump Corporation and eight for the Trump Payroll Corporation. The defense said it would appeal the verdict. On January 10, 2023, Weisselberg was sentenced in accordance with his plea deal.
On January 13, the organization was fined the maximum allowable $1.6 million (with three charges for tax fraud plus several others for offenses such as conspiracy and falsifying business records). The organization could be further impacted by banks and businesses with internal policies against dealing with felons.

Fourth grand jury

By the beginning of 2023, it was reported that prosecutors hoped to bring new charges against Weisselberg to pressure him to testify against Trump, possibly regarding the hush-money payment to Stormy Daniels, which the former CFO reportedly has direct knowledge of, or possible insurance fraud. Additionally, a former senior U.S. Justice Department official hired by the DA in late 2022, who led the AG's civil case against Trump, was reportedly likely to lead the broader criminal inquiry as well. After the organization was sentenced, Bragg confirmed that a broader investigation of it would continue "as long as the facts and the law require".

On January 17, 2023, Cohen met with the DA's office about the hush-money payment, which was expected to be scrutinized as a misdemeanor charge for falsifying business records. This was reportedly possible to escalate to a felony if the crime was committed to carry out or conceal a second offense, which the violation of a state election law might be a candidate for. (It is less clear whether the charge could be escalated to a felony due to the connected violation of a federal election law, which the payment arguably constitutes.)

On January 30, a grand jury reportedly began hearing evidence related to the payment. On February 1, Cohen said he had given his cellphones to the DA's prosecutors, who wanted evidence of communications including voice recordings of Daniels's former lawyer Keith Davidson. The same week, prosecutors confirmed that they might leverage additional charges including insurance fraud against Weisselberg to pressure him to turn on Trump. On February 8, Cohen met with the DA's office for the 15th time, with another meeting planned; he affirmed his confidence that further charges could be brought.

On March 1, The New York Times reported that Kellyanne Conway, who managed the final months of Trump's 2016 campaign and Cohen notified of the hush-money payment, was seen that day entering the DA's office. The Times noted that the defense was likely to attempt to discredit Cohen as a witness, but pointed out that if Trump was convicted, he could face a non-mandatory sentence of up to four years in prison. On March 3, Cohen met with the DA's office for the 18th time and expected to testify to the grand jury "very soon". Trump administration advisor Hope Hicks met with the DA's office on March 6, by which time two organization employees had testified, as well as two former National Enquirer executives who helped broker the hush-money deal and a lawyer for Daniels. Conway met a second time with the DA's office on March 8.

By March 9, prosecutors had offered Trump a chance to testify before the grand jury the following week, indicating that they were likely preparing to indict him. Around that time, Trump and his spokesperson began referring to both Daniels's allegation and the DA's proceedings as "extortion". On March 10, Trump's lawyer Joe Tacopina asked New York City's Department of Investigation to review the criminal probe, asserting its "weaponization". On March 13, Tacopina announced that his client would not testify. The same week, Cohen reportedly testified before the jury. On March 15, Daniels met with the DA's office and agreed to testify if needed. Early the next morning, The Guardian reported that Trump's lawyers had argued to the DA that Trump should not be indicted on the basis that the payment did not draw from campaign funds and would have been made regardless of his candidacy. Cohen was expecting to stand by as a rebuttal witness on March 20, reportedly to respond to testimony from a lawyer who has represented him. Law enforcement and security agencies were reportedly assessing plans regarding the Manhattan Criminal Court area for a potential indictment of Trump the week of March 20. On his social-media platform Truth Social, Trump asserted that he would be arrested on March 21 and that the proceedings were disinformation backed by President Joe Biden, calling on his own supporters to engage in a political protest.

If indicted, Trump would be required to visit the DA's office to be booked, fingerprinted, and have his mug shot taken. If he fails to comply and remains in Florida (which Tacopina said he would not), he would be constitutionally required to be extradited, which would have to be approved (and possibly delayed but almost certainly not stopped) by that state's governor and Trump's rival in the 2024 Republican Party presidential primaries, Ron DeSantis. A warrantless arrest may also be invoked in the case of felony charges. Additionally, Trump could contest the warrant, but if unsuccessful could be held on bail. It is also possible that the DA could move to disqualify Tacopina based on his attorney–client relationship with Daniels begun in 2018 when she consulted with him about possibly representing her in the scandal.

Reactions 

In December 2020, Fox News host Sean Hannity stated that "The president out the door needs to pardon his whole family and himself because they want this witch hunt to go on in perpetuity, they're so full of rage and insanity against the president." Some news outlets speculated that the president might preemptively pardon his children in connection with the criminal case, although the power only applies to federal crimes.
At a political rally on July 3, 2021, Trump appeared to acknowledge the truth of the New York prosecutors' criminal charges against his company, then described filing taxes as generally confusing; journalist Andrew Feinberg referred to these statements as an "admission". A Slate writer compared Trump's recent alleged confusion about taxes to his prior  expertise, for example saying he was "smart" for not paying income tax during certain years while debating Hillary Clinton in 2016.

In mid-2021, the Republican National Committee (RNC) agreed to financially support Trump's legal defense in both inquiries. In October, it paid $121,670 to a law firm employed by Trump. The next month, a Republican (GOP) spokesperson called Trump "a leader of our party [whose] record of achievement is critical to the GOP" and referred to the investigations as a "never ending witch hunt" by Democrats. In December, it was reported that the RNC had agreed to pay up to $1.6 million of Trump's legal expenses for both cases. Some sources have pointed out that the matters being investigated took place prior to Trump becoming president. Speaking to Hannity on Fox News in February 2022, Eric Trump argued that the investigations were only being conducted because his father was "clearly the frontrunner for 2024". In early July 2022, the Washington Examiner reported that Trump was considering announcing his presidential run soon, apparently in order to increase his sway against the "scathing hearings" in the House Select Committee on the January 6 Attack. The RNC indicated that it would cut off legal funding for Trump as required if he officially announced his candidacy. Later in July, Rolling Stone reported that Trump hoped to use the executive office to protect him from federal prosecution, but "The law is less clear on whether a president can face prosecution from states while in office."

In January 2022, NBC News cited a criminal defense lawyer it employs as a legal analyst, who observed: "Generally, lying to a bank to obtain a loan can be a crime." A former president has never been criminally indicted, with Richard Nixon being pardoned in 1974 for any crimes he may have committed in office. A New York defense lawyer who worked for Cyrus Vance Jr. calls a potential trial against Trump a "logistical nightmare", saying it "would be unprecedented in a courthouse that has seen many, many high-profile cases over the decades." The director of public information for New York's state courts points out that 4,000 court officers (with training similar to police) are employed to uphold public safety if necessary. In the wake of the two lead prosecutors resigning from the criminal case, media outlets and a lawyer for Trump opined that the investigation seemed to be unwinding; some noted that while Vance had confidence in the criminal case, his successor, Bragg, has exhibited less interest. Bragg maintained in early April that the investigation was ongoing. On April 25, Rise and Resist protesters gathered outside New York County Courthouse with a large sign reading "Indict Trump". According to a legal expert cited by The Guardian in May, the nature of grand juries often favors the prosecution, with only a majority vote needed to secure an indictment, as well as "legally sufficient evidence of a crime and ... reasonable cause to believe that the accused person committed that crime". On a July podcast with John C. Coffee, Pomerantz argued that Trump would have been charged if not for his "financial and political influence" and that such an outcome would "vindicate the rule of law". In early 2023, Cohen opined that Bragg may not have followed in his predecessor's footsteps due to his need to catch up in his new role first.

In early September 2022, law professor Jessica Levinson stated on NPR that Trump's potential campaign for the 2024 presidential election "will have no legal impact on any of the criminal investigations against him [but] will have a huge political impact" regarding the rule of law and future elections. On September 22, The Wall Street Journal editorial board—having written earlier in the year that the investigation "looks like more evidence of the decline of America's rule of law"—stated that "Trump has made a business and political career of getting away with whatever he can, and it's easy to imagine he crossed a line." Later in the month, a former assistant DA and asset forfeiture chief in the Manhattan DA's office argued, "This is going to be a very difficult case for the defendants to win. One of the best defenses to this matter is to delay." New York Times columnist Gail Collins opined that Trump supporters would not be alienated by the former president's apparent fraud due to his already being well-known for distorting the truth.

On November 4, citing McConney's stated involvement in providing fringe benefits, Andrea Bernstein stated on NPR that "under New York law, the company is criminally liable if high managerial agents commit crimes." On November 14, CBS News cited a former employee of the organization's accounting department as saying that he knew about Allen and Barry Weisselberg's fringe benefits and that the former's propinquity with Trump was known within the department. On November 15, New York Daily News asserted that the removal of Weisselberg's name from a copy of a page from Trump's ledger (provided to a New York City grand jury in 2021) might constitute obstruction of justice. After the defense in the criminal trial rested its case, Reuters argued that the testimony of its witness Donald Bender "appeared to backfire ... and bolster the prosecution's case".

In mid-November, CBS News reported that three law firms involved in the criminal trial had received more than $500,000 from the Save America PAC and the RNC over the previous two months. Some political experts have argued that the fallout of the criminal conviction would do little to damage Trump's political career due to his not being personally convicted. Contrarily, some with inside knowledge of the investigations argue that Trump has been personally implicated via the guilty verdict against his company, despite denials of wrongdoing made on his behalf. An indictment or even a conviction would not constitutionally bar Trump from the presidential election.

On November 16, 2022, a New York appeals court ruled that Cohen could sue the organization to reimburse legal fees (in the range of millions of dollars) for Trump-related litigation including the investigations by the DA and AG. After the organization's conviction in the criminal case, Cohen stated that Trump "should be very uncomfortable" regarding his own testimony to the DA's office.
Some speculated that the conviction would be highly damaging to the company's reputation, with a law professor at Pace University calling it a "death knell". Bloomberg opined that the felony charges would be eclipsed by their impact. New York City Councilmember Shekar Krishnan called for the city's parks department to terminate a golf-course contract with an organization affiliate (previously unsuccessfully attempted by former mayor Bill de Blasio in response to the January 6 U.S. Capitol attack), but a spokesperson for Mayor Eric Adams pointed out that the affiliate itself was not convicted, so "ending the contract we inherited would likely still require the city to pay up to tens of millions of dollars to the Trump affiliate". On January 1, 2023, an MSNBC opinion columnist cited the investigations amongst several others in arguing that Trump was likely to be charged that year. Writing for New York Daily News, investigative journalist David Cay Johnston opined that Trump could be convicted on "easy-to-prove state income tax fraud charges" based on documents available to the DA's office, including Trump's publicly released tax returns which Johnston said were "rich with what the IRS calls 'badges of fraud,'" such as "hundreds of thousands of dollars in unexplained expenses" on numerous Schedule C forms showing zero income and "revenues and expenses that [suspiciously match] to the dollar". Johnston pointed out that the former method was used by Trump in 1984 and (according to Johnston) found by New York judges to constitute civil tax fraud, which he argued that Trump undoubtedly knew before repeating 26 times, thus providing evidence of mens rea (knowledge of one's criminal intent).

The Independent pointed out that hours after the organization was sentenced, Donald Trump Jr. made a social-media post ridiculing paying taxes, implying it supports foreign interests, namely Ukraine in its defense against Russian invasion.

In mid-March 2023, potential rival for the 2024 Republican nomination Asa Hutchinson argued that if indicted, Trump should withdraw his candidacy "out of respect for the institution of the presidency", not because it would be judicially damning but because it would distract from the election. The five GOP senators who had endorsed Trump's campaign said that his indictment would not alter their support for him. Trump-aligned representative Marjorie Taylor Greene cautioned against protests if Trump is indicted, warning of a repeat of the January 6 attack. NBC New York compared Trump's rhetoric in his calls for protests to that which he used before the insurrection. House Speaker Kevin McCarthy also discouraged protests, asserting that not even Trump wanted them. Conservative lawyer George Conway used the occasion to suggest that Trump's best (albeit unlikely) defense could be insanity.

In March, a former Federal Election Commission (FEC) commissioner said it was not the province of the Manhattan DA to prosecute a federal campaign finance violation (which the "nuisance settlement" payment arguably did not constitute), and was instead the jurisdiction of the FEC or the Justice Department (which both reputedly knew of Trump's alleged misdeeds but chose not to prosecute him).

See also
 List of lawsuits involving Donald Trump

Notes

References

Donald Trump controversies
Donald Trump litigation
The Trump Organization